Béni Slimane District is a district of Médéa Province, Algeria.

The district is further divided into 3 municipalities:
Beni Slimane
Sidi Errabia
Bouskene

Districts of Médéa Province